Destin may refer to:

 Destin (name)
 Destin, Florida, United States, city in Okaloosa County
 Destin Bridge, connects Destin, Florida with Santa Rosa Island
 Destin Pipeline, a natural gas pipeline
 Destin (song), a French song recorded by Celine Dion
 Destin (film), a 1927 French silent film directed by Dimitri Kirsanoff